Banniganur also spelled as Banniganooru is a village in the Sindhanur taluk of Raichur district in the Indian state of Karnataka. Banniganur is located near to Pothnal stream joining Tungabhadra river. Banniganur lies on road connecting Pothnal-Balganur.

Demographics
 India census, Banniganur had a population of 1,461 with 715 males and 746 females and 256 Households.

See also
Ragalaparvi
Valkamdinni
Yapalaparvi
Olaballari
Sindhanur
Raichur

References

External links
raichur.nic.in

Villages in Raichur district